Alfred William Parsons RA (2 December 1847 – 16 January 1920) was an English artist: illustrator, landscape painter and garden designer.

Alfred Parsons was well known for his English landscape paintings and fine botanical illustrations which brought him into contact with William Robinson, for whom he provided illustrations. He regularly exhibited his art work from 1868 to 1919.  He also artistically designed significant gardens mostly in England and some in Scotland and the United States. Parsons and his contemporaries believed that an artist could design better gardens. He won the Chantrey Bequest in 1887 and the published his book Notes From Japan in 1896. Parsons became President of the Society of Painters in Watercolours in 1905, and among many other works, he illustrated Ellen Willmott's The Genus Rosa. He was a keen gardener and for the last six years of his life took care of his roses at Luggershill, Broadway, Worcestershire, England.

Life and Works

Alfred Parsons was born in Beckington near Frome, Somerset, the son of Dr Joshua Parsons, a surgeon and dedicated gardener of alpines and correspondent of William Robinson, and raised in London. After being educated privately, he started work as a clerk in the Post Office in 1867. After two years, he left the unsuitable desk-job to pursue studies at the Kensington School of Art, and went on to exhibit at various galleries including the Grosvenor Gallery and the Royal Academy, where he exhibited every year from 1874 to the end of his life.

Parsons, whose interest in "Englishness" paralleled the tastes of upper-class American émigrés, joined the notable artistic community in the village of Broadway in the Cotswolds (Worcestershire). His associates included the American artists Francis Davis Millet, who remained Parson's closest friend until he drowned aboard the Titanic, and  Edwin Austin Abbey, with whom he collaborated in illustrated books. Through American contacts made while at the artists' colony he became an illustrator for Harper's Magazine, and also provided illustrations for books – including short stories by Thomas Hardy and travel books (see below). Henry James noted that Parson's images of English country life mirrored the aspirations of Americans:
Was it there that Mr. Parsons learned so well how Americans would like England to appear? ...The England of his pencil... is exactly the England that the American imagination, restricted to itself, constructs from the poets, the novelists, from all the delightful testimony it inherits". 

The three men, Parsons, Millet and Abbey, lived together and entertained sociably at 54, Bedford Gardens, London. William Robinson asked him to provide illustrations for The Wild Garden: Or, Our Groves and Shrubberies Made Beautiful by the Naturalisation of Hardy Exotic Plants (1881, the 1903-5th edition being the best one) led to Robinson's invitation for Parsons to lend advice at his Gravetye Manor. Several artists engraved Parsons' illustrations. As it was the custom, he never engraved himself. Parsons' first garden commission, however, came through the architect Philip Webb, who was designing Clouds in Wiltshire for Mr and Mrs Percy Wyndham, prominent figures among the aesthetic-minded group called "The Souls": Parsons provided an unostentatious planting of spring bulbs, Magnolia × soulangeana, roses and lilies, in a framework of clipped yews, wedding new and old elements.

Parsons' long-lasting association with the Anglo-American group centred in Broadway, began in 1885, when Parsons and his London friends rented a house facing the Green, where John Singer Sargent began painting Carnation, Lily, Lily, Rose. Parsons first made a garden for himself and his friends at Russell House facing the Evesham road at the western entrance to Broadway, then a garden setting for Mary Anderson, Mrs Antonio de Navarro at Court Farm (1896 onwards) and later for himself, at Luggershill (1903 onwards).

Parsons' fine illustrated book, his only published text, Notes in Japan (London, 1895, reprinted) came from his visit to that country between 1892 and 1894.

Ellen Willmott's The Genus Rosa, published in two volumes between 1910 and 1914, includes 132 watercolours of roses painted by  Parsons between 1890 and 1908, which are now held by the Lindley Library in London.  Willmott also commissioned Parsons to paint her three gardens.

As a designer of gardens, Parsons went into partnership in 1898 with Captain Walter Croker St-Ives Partridge (1855—1924), as Parsons and Partridge of Newbury, Berkshire. In 1884 they took into the partnership Charles Clement Tudway (1846—1926). Parson's  restorations of old gardens and designs of sympathetic settings for old houses can be appreciated at 15th-century Great Chalfield Manor and at Elizabethan  Littlecote House, both in Wiltshire. Alfred Parsons and Walter Partridge also worked on the gardens at Welbeck Abbey, 1899—1905 and at Bryngarw, Glamorganshire. An early essay was Wightwick Manor, a reproduction black-and-white house, for which Parsons provided the garden in 1887.

He was elected Associate Member of the Royal Academy (ARA) in 1897 and Royal Academician (RA) in 1911.

References

Further reading

Illustrated by Alfred Parsons:

 Robinson, William. The Wild Garden (London: John Murray, 1883).
 Abbey, Edwin Austin. Old Songs, with drawings (Harper & Bros. 1889).
 Dobson, Austin. The quiet life : certain verses by various hands (New York : Harper & Brothers, 1890)
 Quiller-Couch, Arthur Thomas. The Warwickshire Avon (Harper & Bros. 1892).
 Parsons, Alfred. Notes in Japan (Harper & Bros. 1895).
 Wordsworth, William. A Selection from the Sonnets of William Wordsworth with numerous Illustrations by Alfred Parsons (Harper & Bros. 1890).
 Wordsworth, William. Wordsworth (Longmans, Green & Co. 1897)

External links

 
 Alfred Parsons (RA Collections).
 Alfred Parsons  (Bridgemanart.com)

English landscape painters
English landscape and garden designers
English watercolourists
English illustrators
Botanical illustrators
English engravers
People from Somerset
1920 deaths
1847 births
Artists from Somerset
19th-century English painters
English male painters
20th-century English painters
20th-century British printmakers
Royal Academicians
19th-century English male artists
20th-century English male artists
20th-century engravers